Vasil Shkurti (born Vassilis Skourtis-Shkurtaj on 27 February 1992) is an Albanian professional footballer who plays as a forward for Laçi in the Kategoria Superiore.

Club career

Early years
Born in Chania, Greece, Shkurti played youth football for four clubs, including Ajax, Olympiacos and Lazio. He arrived at the latter in January 2010 as compatriot Igli Tare acted as the club's director of football.

In the 2010–11 season, Shkurti made his senior debut, representing Panionios in his country of adoption but also being loaned by the Superleague side to Thrasyvoulos in January 2011. Roughly one year later, he moved to Portugal with lowly Vilaverdense, and the following campaign he signed with Tondela in that nation's Segunda Liga, led by former Benfica and Portugal great Vítor Paneira.

Shkurti did not settle with any team in the following years, representing in quick succession Roda (Dutch Eredivisie), Niki Volos, Asteras Tripoli and Skoda Xanthi (all in the Greek top level) and Aris Limassol from the Cypriot First Division.

Luftëtari
On 8 September 2017, Shkurti joined Albanian Superliga side Luftëtari on a one-year contract– as the transfer was done after the deadline, he remained ineligible to play for the club until the next transfer window. He made his competitive debut on 31 January 2018 in a 0–3 away loss against Laçi for the first leg of the quarter-finals of the Albanian Cup, and first appeared in the league four days later in the goalless draw to Lushnja.

Shkurti scored his first goals on 10 February 2018, in the 3–2 win at Teuta Durrës. On 1 March, he netted the lone goal at Flamurtari to help the team climb to sixth place, also giving them the first win at Vlorë in 40 years.

Kukësi
On 3 January 2019, Shkurti moved to Kukësi on a two-year deal. He was presented the following day, alongside his former teammate Eduart Rroca.

Club statistics

Honours
Kukësi
Albanian Cup: 2018–19

References

External links

Vasil Shkurti at the Albanian Football Association
Vasil Shkurti at TheFinalBall

1992 births
Living people
Footballers from Chania
Greek people of Albanian descent
Association football forwards
Greek footballers
Albanian footballers
Albania youth international footballers
Albania under-21 international footballers
Panionios F.C. players
Thrasyvoulos F.C. players
Platanias F.C. players
C.D. Tondela players
Roda JC Kerkrade players
Niki Volos F.C. players
Asteras Tripolis F.C. players
Xanthi F.C. players
Aris Limassol FC players
Luftëtari Gjirokastër players
FK Kukësi players
Jiangxi Beidamen F.C. players
Super League Greece players
Football League (Greece) players
Liga Portugal 2 players
Segunda Divisão players
Eredivisie players
Cypriot First Division players
Kategoria Superiore players
China League One players
Greek expatriate footballers
Albanian expatriate footballers
Albanian expatriate sportspeople in Italy
Expatriate footballers in Portugal
Albanian expatriate sportspeople in Portugal
Expatriate footballers in the Netherlands
Albanian expatriate sportspeople in the Netherlands
Expatriate footballers in Cyprus
Albanian expatriate sportspeople in Cyprus
Expatriate footballers in China
Albanian expatriate sportspeople in China
Olympiacos F.C. players